Nizhneye Krasnoye is a rural locality (a village) in Dobryansky District, Perm Krai, Russia. The population was 15 as of 2010. There are 4 streets.

Geography 
Nizhneye Krasnoye is located 70 km north of Dobryanka (the district's administrative centre) by road. Krasnoye is the nearest rural locality.

References 

Rural localities in Dobryansky District